Indian Rock may refer to:

 Indian rock, a music genre in the country of India
 Indian Rock, tall peak in the state of Washington, USA
 Indian Rock Park, a public park in the city of Berkeley, California
 Indian Rock Park, an Indian battle site and public park in Salina, Kansas
 Indian Rock Schoolhouse, a historic schoolhouse in Amenia, New York
 Indian rock-cut architecture
 Indian Rocks, a group of rocks in the South Shetland Islands, Antarctica 
 Indian Rocks Beach, Florida, a city in Pinellas County, Florida
 Indian Rocks Causeway, a bascule bridge at Indian Rocks Beach, Florida
 Indian Rocks Dining Hall, a historic building in Preston County, West Virginia